The 2021–22 Indian Super League season was the eighth season of the Indian Super League (ISL) since its formation in 2013 and the 26th season of the top division of Indian football league system. The season started on 19 November 2021 and concluded with the final on 20 March 2022. Except for the final, it was hosted behind closed doors across three venues in Goa due to the COVID-19 pandemic in India. 

Jamshedpur won the League Winners' Shield and Hyderabad won the championship having defeated Kerala Blasters in the final.

Changes from last season 
The All India Football Federation Executive Committee decided to implement the 3+1 rule in I-League and discussed implementing it in the Super League from the 2021–22 season. FSDL, agreeing to the suggestions made by AIFF Executive Committee have made significant changes in players registration and foreign players number in the squad enforceable from 2021 to 2022 Indian Super League season. The changes have been made keeping in mind the AFC Club competitions regulations which follow 3+1 foreign players rule and to give more chances to domestic players in the league. The changes made were:

 A club can now sign maximum of six and minimum of four foreigners including at least one player who hails from an AFC affiliated nation.
 A maximum of four foreigners can  play on the field at any instant of a match.
 A decrease in foreign player numbers from 5 to 4 mandates the clubs to have a minimum of seven 7 Indian players on the field at any point of time.
 A club also has an option to sign a foreign marquee player within the League-approved classifications.
 Clubs to increase their development player signing from minimum 2 to 4, while continuing to have 2 of such development players be part of the match-day squad.
 A club can have a maximum squad strength of 35 players, with at least 3 registered goalkeepers. A club can also have an injury replacement for an Indian player (outside of the max. 35 registered players).

Teams

Stadiums and locations

Personnel and sponsorship

Head coaching changes

Roster changes

Foreign players
Bold letters suggest the player was signed in the winter transfer window

Regular season

League table

Results

Results by match
The table lists the results of teams after each match.

Playoffs

Bracket

Semi-finals

Final

Season statistics

Scoring

Top scorers

Top Indian scorers

Hat-tricks

Most assists

Clean Sheets

Discipline

Player 
 Most yellow cards: 7
6 players

 Most red cards: 1
12 players

Club 
 Most yellow cards: 50
Kerala Blasters

 Most red cards: 3
ATK Mohun Bagan

Awards

Season awards

Hero of the Match

See also
 2021–22 I-League
 2021–22 in Indian football
 2022 AFC Champions League
 2022 AFC Cup
 2021 Durand Cup

Notes

References

External links
 

Indian Super League seasons
 
2021–22 in Indian football leagues